Ajoy Dey (22 April 1952 – 21 May 2021) was an Indian politician who has been involved in the politics with the All India Trinamool Congress. He was an MLA from the Indian state of West Bengal and also was the Chairman of Santipur Municipality which is the second oldest Municipality of West Bengal established in 1853.

Biography
Earlier he was a politician from Indian National Congress. From 1991 to 2016, he was the MLA for the Shantipur Assembly constituency in the West Bengal Legislative Assembly.

Dey died on 21 May 2021 from COVID-19.

References

External links 
West Bengal Legislative Assembly

West Bengal MLAs 1991–1996
West Bengal MLAs 1996–2001
West Bengal MLAs 2001–2006
2021 deaths
Indian National Congress politicians
Trinamool Congress politicians from West Bengal
People from Nadia district
Deaths from the COVID-19 pandemic in India
1952 births